Gidar (Gidder), or Kaɗa, is a Biu–Mandara (Chadic) language of Cameroon and Chad.

Gedar is spoken from Guider to the Chadian border in the Far North Region of Cameroon, in Mayo-Kani Department (arrondissements of Kaélé and Moutourwa), and in the North Region, Mayo-Louti Department. Baynawa means "my friend" in the Gedar language, and this name is what some people use for the Gedar (ALCAM 1983).

References 

Languages of Cameroon
Languages of Chad
Biu-Mandara languages